Ja tu tylko sprzątam is an album released by Polish rapper O.S.T.R. on February 22, 2008.

Track listing

Singles
 "1980" (2008)
 "Jak nie Ty, to Kto?" (2008)

Chart positions

Notes

2008 albums
O.S.T.R. albums
Polish-language albums